Alessandro Lovisa (born 22 August 2001) is an Italian football player. He plays for  club Triestina.

Club career
He was raised in the youth teams of Pordenone and made his professional debut in Serie C for the club on 31 March 2018 against Padova, at the age of 16.

On 17 August 2018, he moved to Napoli and signed a three-year contract. After spending the 2018–19 season with Napoli's Under-19 squad (including the 2018–19 UEFA Youth League), he returned to Pordenone. 

On 5 August 2019, he left Pordenone again, signing a three-year contract with Fiorentina. After spending the 2019–20 season with Fiorentina's Under-19 squad, he then went on series of loans to Serie C clubs, joining Gubbio, Legnago and Lucchese, but failing to establish himself as a starting player in any of those loans.

On 12 January 2022, he returned to Pordenone on loan from Fiorentina. He made his Serie B debut for Pordenone on 16 January in a game against Lecce and made his first start in the next game on 22 January 2022 against Perugia.

On 20 July 2022, Lovisa signed a three-year deal with Triestina.

Personal life
He is the son of the president of Pordenone, Mauro Lovisa.

References

External links
 

2001 births
Living people
People from San Vito al Tagliamento
Footballers from Friuli Venezia Giulia
Italian footballers
Association football midfielders
Pordenone Calcio players
ACF Fiorentina players
A.S. Gubbio 1910 players
F.C. Legnago Salus players
S.S.D. Lucchese 1905 players
U.S. Triestina Calcio 1918 players
Serie B players
Serie C players